Mıgırdiç Mıgıryan (also spelled Mıgır, Mığır, Migir in Turkish) was one of two athletes who represented the Ottoman Empire in the Olympic Games which was held in Stockholm in 1912.

Migiryan participated in shot put, discus throw, two handed shot put, pentathlon, and decathlon competitions. Migir Migiryan along with ethnic Armenian Vahram Papazyan were the only two athletes representing Turkey in the country's first official participation of the Olympics.

Life
Migir Migiryan attended the prestigious Robert College in Constantinople. One of his classmates was Vahram Papazyan, another ethnic Armenian Olympian who would participate with him at the 1912 Olympics.

When Ottoman Empire was admitted to the International Olympic Committee (IOC) in 1911, president of the Ottoman Empire's Olympic committee Selim Sırrı Tarcan placed advertisements in the local Ikdam and Sabah newspapers in order to recruit athletes for the 1912 Olympic Games in Stockholm. Migiryan responded to the advertisement and expressed his desires to participate in the games.

Unlike his counterpart Vahram Papazyan, who did not have the required finances to pay for the trip, Migir Migiryan came from a wealthy family who managed to cover all the necessary expenses needed for the trip to the Stockholm Olympics.

Having participated in five different sporting events, Migir Migiryan holds the record of most sporting events participated by a Turkish athlete in Olympic history.

Olympics
During the Olympics, Migiryan managed to play all five sports. However, while competing against famed athlete Jim Thorpe during the Decathlon, Migiryan suffered a wrist injury and was forced to discontinue.

Results

See also
Turkey at the Olympics
National Olympic Committee of Turkey

References

External links

1882 births
Year of death missing
Date of death missing
Place of death missing
People from Üsküdar
Sportspeople from Istanbul
Armenians from the Ottoman Empire
Athletes from the Ottoman Empire
Olympic competitors for the Ottoman Empire
Athletes (track and field) at the 1912 Summer Olympics
Sportspeople from the Ottoman Empire
Robert College alumni
Olympic decathletes